Ray Minus (born 3 July 1964 in Nassau) is a Bahamian professional bantam/super bantam/feather/super feather/light/light welterweight boxer of the 1980s, '90s and 2000s who won the Bahamas lightweight title, Bahamas light welterweight title, World Boxing Council (WBC) Continental Americas bantamweight title, World Boxing Association (WBA) Inter-Continental super bantamweight title, and Commonwealth bantamweight title, and was a challenger for the World Boxing Council (WBC) Continental Americas super bantamweight title against César Soto, World Boxing Council (WBC) Continental Americas lightweight title against Leavander Johnson, World Boxing Organization (WBO) bantamweight title against Israel Contreras, and International Boxing Federation (IBF) bantamweight title against Orlando Canizales, his professional fighting weight varied from , i.e. bantamweight to , i.e. light welterweight.

References

External links

1964 births
Bahamian male boxers
Bantamweight boxers
Featherweight boxers
Light-welterweight boxers
Lightweight boxers
Living people
Sportspeople from Nassau, Bahamas
Super-bantamweight boxers
Super-featherweight boxers